Diego Mateo Alustiza (born 7 August 1978) is an Argentine professional footballer who played for Newell's Old Boys as a defensive midfielder.

Football career
Born in Roldán, Santa Fe, Mateo started his professional career in 1996 with Newell's Old Boys, where he made over 100 overall appearances, scoring four goals in the top division. In 2000, he joined U.S. Lecce in Italy, but left the club after appearing in only one fourth of the Serie A games during the season, with the Apulia side narrowly avoiding relegation.

In 2001 Mateo moved to Spain, where he would spend a great portion of his career: first, he was instrumental in helping Racing de Santander return to La Liga by scoring four times in 32 matches, and was relatively used in the following two top flight campaigns. In January 2005 he returned to the second division, playing for Real Valladolid.

Mateo returned to Argentina for a spell at San Lorenzo de Almagro, then went again to Spain and its second level after signing with Hércules CF. He then played two years in his country with Gimnasia y Esgrima de Jujuy but, after the team's relegation in 2009, the 31-year-old returned to his first club Newell's.

Honours
Newell's Old Boys
Primera División: 2013 Final

External links
 Argentine League statistics  
 
 Biography at Fútbol 91 
 
 Football-Lineups profile

1978 births
Living people
People from San Lorenzo Department
Argentine people of Spanish descent
Argentine footballers
Association football midfielders
Argentine Primera División players
Newell's Old Boys footballers
San Lorenzo de Almagro footballers
Gimnasia y Esgrima de Jujuy footballers
Serie A players
U.S. Lecce players
La Liga players
Segunda División players
Racing de Santander players
Real Valladolid players
Hércules CF players
Argentine expatriate footballers
Expatriate footballers in Italy
Expatriate footballers in Spain
Argentine expatriate sportspeople in Spain
Sportspeople from Santa Fe Province